Liam Carroll is an Irish retired hurler who played as a midfielder for the Offaly senior team.

Born in Kinnitty, County Offaly, Carroll first played competitive hurling in his youth. He made his senior debut with Offaly during the 1984 championship and immediately became a regular member of the team. During his career Carroll won one Leinster medal. He was an All-Ireland runner-up on one occasion.

At club level Carroll is a three-time championship medallist with Kinnitty.

His retirement came following the conclusion of the 1985-86 National League.

Honours

Team

Kinnitty
Offaly Senior Hurling Championship (1): 1983, 1984, 1985

Offaly
Leinster Senior Hurling Championship (1): 1984

References

Living people
Kinnitty hurlers
Offaly inter-county hurlers
Year of birth missing (living people)